Ingenium – Canada's Museums of Science and Innovation, formally the National Museum of Science and Technology, is a Canadian Crown corporation responsible for overseeing national museums related to science and technology. The name is based on the Latin root of the word ingenuity. Until June 2017, the corporation was branded as Canada Science and Technology Museum Corporation

The corporation oversees the Canada Agriculture and Food Museum, the Canada Aviation and Space Museum and the Canada Science and Technology Museum. The organization is headquartered in Ottawa, Ontario.

The corporation's museums are associated with the Canadian Museum Association, the Virtual Museum of Canada and the Canadian Heritage Information Network. Ingenium has an open documents portal where the corporation shares working documents and corporate plans. It also maintains an open data portal.

Ingenium Centre 
In 2016, the Government of Canada announced $150 million in funding to build the Ingenium Centre. The state-of-the-art facility is designed to protect and showcase Canada's national science and technology collection of 85,000 artifacts and nearly two million 2D artifacts.

Construction started in 2017. The completed building is 36,000 m2 and almost 10 storeys high. The library, archives, conservation labs, workshops and staff moved in 2019 and early 2020. The artifact move is expected to last through 2021.

History 
Ingenium was established through an act of parliament (the Museums Act) on July 1, 1990 and is governed by a board of trustees headed by a president and chief executive officer. The museum's reconstruction, "digital strategy" and its change of name were documented in the TVOntario film "How to build a museum for the 21st century", broadcast in December 2018.

Since 2007, Ingenium is supported by the Ingenium Foundation. The foundation achieved official charity status on April 1, 2008.

In 2014, the Canada Science and Technology Museum was forced to close because of toxic mould pollution. Three years into the renovation, in 2017, the three museums under the Canada Science and Technology Museum Corporation, the Museum's CEO Alex Benay announced the rebranding of the network to Ingenium.

As of September 2018, the Ingenium's Science and Technology Museum stopped collecting artifacts for the foreseeable future.

Exhibits 
Exhibits are housed in the Canada Agriculture and Food Museum, the Canada Aviation and Space Museum and the Canada Science and Technology Museum, all located across Ottawa, Ontario. Shared, the three museums under the corporation host twenty permanent exhibitions:

 Artifact Alley - Artifact Alley is the main hall of the Canada Science and Technology Museum. The hall displays more than 700 artifacts, some of which are interactive.
 Canola! Seeds of Innovation - created to celebrate the 50th anniversary of the creation of Canola in collaboration with the Canola Initiative National Advisory Committee (CINAC)
 Crazy Kitchen + - the oldest exhibition in the collection, it dates back to 1967 when the Canada Science and Technology Museum opened to display optical illusions 
 Discovery Park - Outdoor Exhibition - an exhibition on renewable energy and technologies 
 Engines: Power to Fly - showcases the museums' collection of airplane engines 
 Food Preservation: The Science You Eat - explores the science of food preservation 
 From Earth to Us - the exhibition explores how natural resources are transformed 
 Hidden Worlds - a display of the technologies that help humanity discover our world like microscopes and telescopes 
 Life in Orbit: The International Space Station - developed with the Canadian Space Agency. Visitors learn about life in space 
 Main Exhibition Hall - the main hall of the Canada Aviation and Space Museum 
 Medical Sensations - explores the world of medical innovation and technology in Canada
 Sound by Design - showcases the changes in sound technology that have occurred in the last 150 years 
 Steam: A World in Motion - an exhibition about steam transportation and how it ruled Canada from 1900 to 1960
 Technology in our Lives - explores the relationship between household technologies and Canadians since the Second World War. It also features a tiny house 
 Wearable Tech - explores technologies that are designed for the human body since the 1800s
 ZOOOM - Children's Innovation Zone - a hands on children's exhibition at the Canada Science and Technology Museum
 Into the Great Outdoors - discovers the technologies used by Canadians to explore the outdoors
 Canada in Space - the newest permanent exhibition at the Canada Aviation and Space Museum about Canada's achievements in space 
 Health in Space: Daring to Explore - talks about the works Canadians have done to improve understanding of health in space

Each museum also hosts temporary exhibitions.

Notes

References

Federal departments and agencies of Canada
Canadian federal Crown corporations
1990 establishments in Ontario
Department of Canadian Heritage
Museum associations and consortia
Ingenium